Kourosh Ahari	(Cyrus Ahari; born 1981) is an Iranian film director, screenwriter, and producer.  He is best known for his psychological horror thriller film 2020 The Night.

He was born in 1981 in Mashhad and moved to the United States at the age of 19. Ahari has a bachelor's degree in cinema, graduating at the top of his class and receiving the Excellence in Film Directing Award.

Selected filmography
2014: The Illusion of Reality (Short) 
2014: Malaise (Short)
2016: The Secret of 40 (Short)
2016: The Yellow Wallpaper
2017: In Passing (Short)
2018: Generations
2020: The Night
Parallel (post-production)

Awards
 Alameda International Film Festival 2018 
 Ensemble Acting Award (Generations)
 California Independent Film Festival 2018 
 Best Short (Generations)
 Molins Film Festival 2020
Best Director; Best Screenplay (The Night)
 Grimm Up North Film Festival 2021
 Best Feature Film (The Night)

References

External links

 

کوروش آهاری - خبرآنلاین

Iranian film directors
Iranian editors
Persian-language film directors
People from Mashhad
1981 births
Living people
Iranian emigrants to the United States
Horror film directors
Iranian screenwriters